MULTI is the first cableless elevator developed by ThyssenKrupp. Rather than using cables to lift the elevator, MULTI uses linear motors. Apart from moving vertically between floors of a building, MULTI can also move horizontally through a floor of a building. MULTI is being tested at Rottweil Test Tower.

History
The system was installed inside a test tower in 2017.

References 

ThyssenKrupp
Elevators